Holy Flying Circus is a 90-minute BBC television comedy film first broadcast in 2011, written by Tony Roche and directed by Owen Harris.

The film is a "Pythonesque" dramatisation of events following the completion of Monty Python's Life of Brian, culminating in the televised debate about the film broadcast in 1979.

Plot
At a meeting in the offices of their film distributor, the members of Monty Python discuss allowing the film Life of Brian to be released in America first because of America's first amendment. John Cleese voices his support for the idea, and says that he loves Americans. We then see American reporters at a screening of the movie where a near riot is taking place, with the protesters condemning the film as "blasphemous". The Pythons review a disheartening statement made by a religious leader, implying that the film causes violence. Cleese misinterprets this (possibly deliberately) and goes off on a tangent about little kids carrying out copycat crucifixions on their friends. Their distributor, Barry, suggests a low profile approach for the UK release so as not to cause too much upset. "Let's not project an advert onto the side of Westminster Abbey or make Life of Brian Christmas crackers".

Much of the film is taken up with preparations for a debate on the BBC2 chat show Friday Night, Saturday Morning. Initially, the Pythons are reluctant to take part but decide that Cleese and Michael Palin should represent the troupe on the programme. Palin's wife is depicted with a remarkable resemblance to Terry Jones (Rufus Jones plays both parts). The production team of the BBC chat show eventually manage to gain a commitment from Malcolm Muggeridge and Mervyn Stockwood, then the Bishop of Southwark, to oppose the two Pythons. Portions of this televised discussion are recreated towards the end of the film.

Cast
 Darren Boyd as John Cleese
 Charles Edwards as Michael Palin
 Steve Punt as Eric Idle
 Rufus Jones as Terry Jones and Michael's Wife
 Tom Fisher as Graham Chapman
 Phil Nichol as Terry Gilliam
 Michael Cochrane as Malcolm Muggeridge
 Roy Marsden as Bishop of Southwark
 Tom Price as Tim Rice
 Stephen Fry as God
 Ben Crispin as Jesus
 Simon Greenall as Barry Atkins
 Paul Chahidi as Harry Balls
 Jason Thorpe as Alan Dick / Desmond Lovely
 Mark Heap as Andrew Thorogood

Title sequence
The title sequence for the film was created using a two meter tall Terry Gilliam-inspired Phonotrope created by Jim Le Fevre. It consisted of over 2000 laser-cut frames and was 1.8 meters wide at its base.

Reception
The film received mixed reviews from critics, while receiving just over half a million viewers on BBC Four and proving very popular on iPlayer. Chris Harvey of The Telegraph wrote, "Constantly inventive, often very funny, the drama followed a fictional religious group intent on pillorying the Pythons and having Life of Brian banned", although he added that it "abandoned some of its humour and subtlety for preachiness." Phil Dyess-Nugent at The A.V. Club praised the concept and most of the performances, but said: "At the risk of committing blasphemy myself, one problem may be that the filmmakers actually love the Pythons too much. If that is a problem, it was probably an insurmountable one, since no one who only loves Python to a sane and reasonable degree was ever going to conceive the idea for this movie." Most praised the casting of the Pythons, predominantly for Palin and Cleese. HFC gained approval from Palin and Terry Jones, but Cleese says he "absolutely detested" the drama, in particular Boyd's portrayal of him. Gilliam commented on the fact that Cleese did not like it, and reasoned that the Pythons would have no reason to complain about somebody "taking the piss" out of them when they'd been doing it to others for years.

References

External links
 
 

2011 television films
2011 films
2011 comedy films
BBC television comedy
Comedy films based on actual events
Films set in the 1970s
Monty Python
Cultural depictions of comedians
Cultural depictions of actors
Cultural depictions of British men
Films directed by Owen Harris (director)
2010s British films
British comedy television films